Florin is a census-designated place (CDP) in Sacramento County, California, United States. It is part of the Sacramento–Roseville–Folsom Metropolitan Statistical Area. The population was 52,388 at the 2020 census, up from 47,513 at the 2010 census and 27,653 at the 2000 census.

Geography
Florin is located at  (38.490157, -121.410862).

Demographics

2010
The 2010 United States Census reported that Florin had a population of 47,513. The racial makeup of Florin was 15,034 (13.0%) White, 7,521 (12.5%) African American, 543 (2.6%) Native American, 13,605 (35.8%) Asian, 815 (2.6%) Pacific Islander, 6,756 (14.2%) from other races, and 3,239 (7.0%) from two or more races. Hispanic or Latino of any race were 13,048 persons (29.3%).

The Census reported that 47,212 people (99.4% of the population) lived in households, 294 (0.6%) lived in non-institutionalized group quarters, and 7 (0%) were institutionalized.

There were 14,804 households, out of which 6,434 (43.5%) had children under the age of 18 living in them, 6,551 (44.3%) were opposite-sex married couples living together, 2,972 (20.1%) had a female householder with no husband present, 1,317 (8.9%) had a male householder with no wife present.  There were 1,077 (7.3%) unmarried opposite-sex partnerships, and 127 (0.9%) same-sex married couples or partnerships. 3,173 households (21.4%) were made up of individuals, and 1,322 (8.9%) had someone living alone who was 65 years of age or older. The average household size was 3.19.  There were 10,840 families (73.2% of all households); the average family size was 3.71.

The population was spread out, with 13,801 people (29.0%) under the age of 18, 5,154 people (10.8%) aged 18 to 24, 12,447 people (26.2%) aged 25 to 44, 10,747 people (22.6%) aged 45 to 64, and 5,364 people (11.3%) who were 65 years of age or older.  The median age was 32.1 years. For every 100 females, there were 96.2 males.  For every 100 females age 18 and over, there were 92.9 males.

The homeowner vacancy rate was 2.3%; the rental vacancy rate was 8.9%.  24,612 people (51.8% of the population) lived in owner-occupied housing units and 22,600 people (47.6%) lived in rental housing units.

2000
As of the census of 2000, there were 27,653 people, 9,165 households, and 6,571 families residing in the CDP. The racial makeup of the CDP was 41.59% White, 18.75% African American, 1.25% Native American, 19.55% Asian, 0.87% Pacific Islander, 10.97% from other races, and 7.01% from two or more races. Hispanic or Latino of any race were 20.83% of the population.

There were 9,165 households, out of which 38.2% had children under the age of 18 living with them, 44.5% were married couples living together, 20.9% had a female householder with no husband present, and 28.3% were non-families. 22.8% of all households were made up of individuals, and 10.3% had someone living alone who was 65 years of age or older.  The average household size was 2.98 and the average family size was 3.51.

In the CDP, the population was spread out, with 32.2% under the age of 18, 9.1% from 18 to 24, 26.9% from 25 to 44, 18.5% from 45 to 64, and 13.3% who were 65 years of age or older.  The median age was 31 years. For every 100 females, there were 92.4 males.  For every 100 females age 18 and over, there were 85.7 males.

The median income for a household in the CDP was $33,793, and the median income for a family was $35,924. Males had a median income of $31,505 versus $27,874 for females. The per capita income for the CDP was $14,606.  About 16.8% of families and 21.7% of the population were below the poverty line, including 33.1% of those under age 18 and 8.2% of those age 65 or over.

Government

History

Prewar
During the early 20th century Florin's economy focused on agricultural production. Strawberries were the most common produce grown. Japanese immigrants were the dominant group in Florin and they were the predominant farmers in Florin, making the area noted for being a Japanese immigrant community. This immigrant group's rendering of land in Florin had some popular renown.  "In his report to Governor William Stephens, Colonel John P. Irish, president of the California Delta Association, described Japanese triumph: 'They [the Californians] had seen the Japanese convert the barren land like that at Florin and Livingston into productive and profitable fields, orchards and vineyards, and intelligence of their industry.'"

The presence of Japanese immigrants in Florin was not always met with such good will as expressed by Colonel Irish.  "As soon as a Jap can produce a lease," the Sacramento Bee warned, "he is entitled to a wife. He sends a copy of his lease back home and gets a picture bride and they increase like rats. Florin [a valley farming town] is producing 85 American-born Japs a year." This article was in critical response to the Gentlemen's Agreement of 1907 between the US and Japan.

World War II
Local and federal treatment of Nisei (Japanese immigrants and US-born Japanese Americans) in Florin took a drastic downturn upon the bombing of Pearl Harbor and the subsequent war between the US and Japan.  At the time, about 2,500 Florin residents were Nikkei, forming a majority of the town's population. With a little fear and a lot of racial hostility, the federal government sent Japanese and Japanese Americans to internment camps according to FDR's Executive Order 9066.  Florin Japanese American resident and educator Mary Tsukamoto recalled "everyone was given short notice for removal. Signs had been nailed to the telephone poles saying that we had to report to various spots." Florin's Japanese and Japanese American residents were forced to "register as families.  We had to report to the Elk Grove Masonic Building where we were given our family numbers, No. 2076." The Elk Grove Masonic Building referred to by Tsukamoto was located in neighboring Elk Grove near a railroad station where the Florin residents were shipped in rail cars to distribution hubs.  At these distribution hubs Florin's residents of Japanese descent were then sent to internment camps far from the coast.

The internment forever changed the character of Florin. Japanese and Japanese American residents had to sell their property within only a few days and often at prices far below their fair market value.  When the Japanese and Japanese Americans were released from the internment camps some were able to return to Florin and start over. Most had to move on to other areas. Florin ceased to be a Japanese American community as it was before the internment.

See also

Leonard M. Landsborough, early agriculturalist and politician

References

External links
Sacramento State Special Collections 

Census-designated places in Sacramento County, California
Census-designated places in California